Vetrovec v R [1982] 1 SCR 811 is a leading Canadian decision on the testimony evidence of accomplices. The case birthed the Vetrovec warning, which gives judges the discretion to warn the jury of the risks of accepting the testimony of untrustworthy witnesses.

External links
 Full text of Supreme Court ruling (9canlii.org)

Supreme Court of Canada cases
1982 in Canadian case law
Canadian evidence case law
Canadian criminal procedure case law